The 2021–22 AEK B.C. season is AEK's 65th season in the top-tier level Greek Basket League. AEK is competing in four different competitions during the season.

Transfers 2021–22

Players In 

|}

Players Out 

|}

Friendlies

Competitions

Overall

Overview

Greek League

League table

Results summary

Results by round

Regular season

Results overview

Quarterfinals

Greek Cup

 Quarterfinals

 Final-4

Greek Super Cup

 Final-4

 Final-4

FIBA Champions League

Group D

Results summary

Results by round

Regular season

Results overview

References

AEK B.C. seasons
AEK B.C. season
AEK B.C. season